Cycling at the 2004 Summer Paralympics in Athens, consisted of 31 events in two disciplines, track cycling and road cycling. Track cycling took place at the Olympic Velodrome, and road cycling at Vouliagmeni.

Classifications and events
B 1-3: Visually impaired athletes; these cyclists used tandem bicycles, with an able-bodied rider in the front seat
LC 1-4: Lower limb and other locomotor disabilities graded by severity; unlike most Paralympic classes, higher numbers here indicate more severe conditions
CP 1-4: Athletes with cerebral palsy or a similar disability; 1 and 2 used tricycles, 3 and 4 used bicycles
HC A, B & C: Hand-using athletes, graded according to their degree of paraplegia or quadriplegia; these cyclists used handcycles

Track events consisted of:
Individual pursuit
Time trial
Individual sprint, covering three laps of the track
Team sprint, with teams of three

Road events consisted of endurance races and time trials. In the endurance road races, athletes with cerebral palsy cycled for a minimum of 15 kilometres, while men with visual impairment covered 120 kilometres. In the time trials, the distances were the same for each classification.

Participating countries

Medal table

Medal summary

Road cycling

Track cycling

See also
Cycling at the 2004 Summer Olympics

References

 
2004 Summer Paralympics events
2004
Paralympics
International cycle races hosted by Greece